Kurshwill 'Percy' Williams (born 5 June 1993 in George) is a South African rugby union player, that played first class rugby union between 2013 and 2016, playing for the  and the . His regular position is scrum-half.

Career

Youth

The joined the Johannesburg-based  team in 2012 and represented them in the 2012 Under-19 Provincial Championship competition.

Golden Lions

A further two appearances followed that season.

Leopards

He joined near-rivals  prior to the 2014 Vodacom Cup season.

He was a member of the  team that won the 2015 Currie Cup First Division.

Representative rugby

He was included in a South African Schools side in 2011 and the South Africa Under-20 squad for the 2013 IRB Junior World Championship.

References

South African rugby union players
Living people
1993 births
Golden Lions players
South Africa Under-20 international rugby union players
Rugby union scrum-halves
Rugby union players from the Western Cape